Kumari Rukmani (19 April 1929 – 4 September 2007), also known as Kumari Rukmini, was an Indian actress and dancer. She has acted in about 100 films in Tamil, Telugu and Hindi languages.

Childhood
She is the daughter of Nungambakkam Janaki, also an actress. She hails from Melattur in Thanjavur district. 
During the shooting of Harishchandra (1932) in Bombay (now Mumbai) the producers were looking for a young actor to feature as Lohidasan. Kumari Rukmani, as a child, was staying with her parents in the next room where T. P. Rajalakshmi who was the female lead in the film, was staying. Rajalakshmi recommended Kumari Rukmani to the producers. The producers talked to the parents and made Kumari Rukmani to feature as Lohidasan in the film. Thus began her film career.

Film career

She featured in many films together with T. P. Rajalakshmi. Her first film as heroine was Sri Valli in which she acted as Valli paired with T. R. Mahalingam.
In 1946 she featured in Lavangi paired with the multi-talented Y. V. Rao. While the shooting of this film was going on both she and Rao fell in love with each other and later got married. Cine actress Lakshmi is their daughter.

Partial filmography

Producer
She has produced two films in Hindi, with Lavangi and Manjari.

Death
After ailing for some time, Kumari Rukmani died on 4 September 2007 at her daughter actress Lakshmi residence in Chennai.

K. T. Rukmini
There was another actress/singer named K. T. Rukmini during 1930/40s. She featured in films like Menaka (1935), Thirumangai Alwar (1940) and her last film was Ponnuruvi (1947)

References

External links
 
 
  - A song sung by Kumari Rukmani from the film Ramadas (1948)
  - A song sung by K. T. Rukmini (with Kothamangalam Seenu from the film Thirumangai Alvar (1940)

1929 births
2007 deaths
Actresses from Chennai
Actresses in Hindi cinema
Actresses in Tamil cinema
20th-century Indian actresses
21st-century Indian actresses
Actresses in Telugu cinema
Child actresses in Tamil cinema
Indian child actresses
People from Thanjavur district